Charles Sturt University is a suburb and location for Charles Sturt University's Wagga Wagga Campus is located in the suburb of Estella.

References

External links 

Suburbs of Wagga Wagga